Alma (2021 Town population: 30,331; CA Population 33,018; UA Population 26,016) is a town in Saguenay–Lac-Saint-Jean, in the Canadian province of Quebec.

Geography
Alma is located on the southeast coast of Lac Saint-Jean where it flows into the  Saguenay River, in the Saguenay–Lac-Saint-Jean region of Quebec, Canada, approximately 175 km north of Quebec City. Alma is the seat of Lac-Saint-Jean-Est Regional County Municipality. Alma is the second city in population in the Saguenay-Lac-Saint-Jean region after the city of Saguenay.

Alma is the seat of the judicial district of Alma.

History
The present town of Alma was formed in 1962 from the merging of four villages: Isle-Maligne, Naudville, Riverbend and St-Joseph d'Alma. The oldest of the villages, St-Joseph-d'Alma, was founded in 1867 by Damase Boulanger. The area became an important industrial centre during the 1920s and 1930s with the construction of a hydro-electrical power station on the Grande-Décharge River, a paper mill (Price) and an aluminum smelting plant (Alcan), all of which are still in activity today.

In 2002, Alma merged with the Municipality of Delisle. Both modern day Alma and St-Joseph d'Alma are named after the Battle of the Alma.

Demographics 

Population trend:
 Population in 2021: 30,915 
 Population in 2011: 30,904 (2006 to 2011 population change: 3%)
 Population in 2006: 29,998
 Population total in 2001: 30,126
 Alma (ville): 25,918
 Delisle (municipality): 4,208
 Population in 1996:
 Alma (ville): 26,127
 Delisle (municipality): 4,256
 Population in 1991:
 Alma (ville): 25,910
 Delisle (municipality): 4,281

Mother tongue:
 English as first language: 0.5%
 French as first language: 98.5%
 English and French as first language: 0.1%
 Other as first language: 0.9%

Transportation

Alma is serviced by the Alma Airport, located 4.1 km to the south of the town.

Notable people
 Camille Bedard, hockey player
 Chris Boucher, basketball player for the Toronto Raptors
 Lucien Bouchard, former premier of Québec
 Guy Cloutier, producer and artist manager
 Guillaume Desbiens, hockey player
 Charles Hudon, hockey player for the Montreal Canadiens
 Pierre Lapointe, singer
 Émilie Fortin Tremblay (1872-1949), one of the first white women to cross the Chilkoot on the way to the Yukon gold fields
 François-Louis Tremblay, Olympic gold medallist short-track speed skater
 Mario Tremblay, hockey player and former coach of the Montreal Canadiens

See also
 List of cities in Quebec

References

External links

 Ville d'Alma

 
Cities and towns in Quebec